The 1960 Argentine Primera División was the 69th season of top-flight football in Argentina. The season began on April 3 and ended on November 27.

Independiente achieved its 6th title while Newell's Old Boys was relegated to Primera B.

League standings

References

Argentine Primera División seasons
Argentine Primera Division
1960 in Argentine football